Monts de Lam is one of six departments in Logone Oriental, a region of Chad. Its capital city is Baïbokoum.

Departments of Chad
Logone Oriental Region